The Marietta Storm is a World Basketball Association franchise based in Marietta, Georgia founded in 2006 by JustUs, LLC, Jennifer Lester, Una Snipes, Stacey Beverley, Tiphanie Watson and Tommy Lester III." The inaugural team included player Jamario Moon.  Games were played at Life University in Marietta, Georgia.  The team won the World Basketball Association franchise of the year in its first season.   
 
The team is currently owned by music mogul Melvin "Mel-Man" Breeden. The Storm plays its home games at Smyrna Recreation Complex in Smyrna, Ga, just outside Atlanta.

2011 Team roster

 Andrew Francis, 6'7", Rwanda
 Ashton Pitts, 6'7"
 Marquis Ruffin, 6'2", Eastern New Mexico
 Andrew Martin, 6'2", Shorter College
 Alex Cornett, 6'10, Kennesaw State
 Isaac Jones, 6'9", Southern Polytechnic University
 Desmond Blue, 6'10", MTSU
 Dietrick King, 6'6", ASA College
 Frank Moultrie, 6'0", Kuztown University [2011 1st Draft Pick]
 Scott Mennicke, 5'11"
 Travis De'Grout, 6'3", Czech Republic
 Vincent Brooks, 6'2", Garden State Rebels

2010 Team roster

 Lance Perique, 6'8", Labanon Fachun
 Alex Owumi, 6'4", France Quimper
 Jonathan Jackson, 6'8", L.A. Push
 John Thomas, 6'6", Assis Basket
 Daryl Ruffus, 6'8", Mexico Bucanoroes
 Anthony Pettaway, 6'8", Dachun Spurs
 Leonard Mendez, 6'5", Georgia State University
 Deandre Bray, 5'5", Jacksonville State
 Chucky Frierson, 6'6", Norway Baerum
 Anthony Joseph, 6'8", Emporia State University
 Paul Harper, 6'7", University of West Georgia
 Parrish Brown, 6'1", Maryland
 Casey Love, 6'6"
 Scott Mennicke, 5'10", Sequoyah High School (2010 First Draft Pick)
 Andrew Martin, 6'3", Shorter College
 Stefhon Hannah, 6'2", Missouri

References

Related links
Official Website

World Basketball Association teams
Basketball teams in Georgia (U.S. state)
Basketball teams established in 2006
Sports in Cobb County, Georgia
2006 establishments in Georgia (U.S. state)